Christopher is the second studio album by American hip hop artist Sleep, a member of the Pacific Northwest hip hop collective Oldominion. It was initially released on Up Above Records on May 31, 2005 and re-released with bonus tracks on Strange Famous Records on November 24, 2009. Guest appearances include Masta Ace and Abstract Rude, among others.

Music 
Christopher features guest performances from Abstract Rude, Zelly Rock, Pale Soul, Masta Ace, Josh Martinez, Toni Hill, Yadira Brown, and Skratch Bastid. The album is produced by Smoke M2D6 and Zebulon Dak of Oldominion, Maker, Vitamin D, Zavala and Pale Soul.

Track listing

References

External links
 Christopher at Discogs
 Christopher at Bandcamp

2005 albums
Sleep (rapper) albums
Strange Famous Records albums